The 2018 Qujing International Challenger was a professional tennis tournament played on hard courts. It was the first edition of the tournament which was part of the 2018 ATP Challenger Tour. It took place in Qujing, China between 19 and 25 March 2018.

Singles main-draw entrants

Seeds

 1 Rankings are as of 5 March 2018.

Other entrants
The following players received wildcards into the singles main draw:
  Cui Jie
  Gao Xin
  He Yecong
  Xia Zihao

The following players received entry from the qualifying draw:
  Sriram Balaji
  Chung Yun-seong
  Mārtiņš Podžus
  Luke Saville

Champions

Singles

 Malek Jaziri def.  Blaž Rola 7–6(7–5), 6–1.

Doubles

 Aliaksandr Bury /  Peng Hsien-yin def.  Wu Di /  Zhang Ze 6–7(3–7), 6–4, [12–10].

References

2018 ATP Challenger Tour